"Another Week"  is a song by Swedish recording artist Eric Saade. The song was released as a digital download on 27 May 2017 through Roxy Recordings. "Another Week" failed to chart in his home country, however, the remix of the song peaked at number 64 in Russia.

Music video
A video to accompany the release of "Another Week" was first released onto YouTube on 20 August 2017. The video was directed by LMDL and produced by House of Wizards.

Track listing

Charts

Release history

References

2017 songs
2017 singles
Eric Saade songs
Songs written by Andrew Bullimore
Songs written by Eric Saade